Marc Galanter is a Professor of Law Emeritus at the University of Wisconsin Law School. Previously he was the John and Rylla Bosshard Professor of Law and South Asian Studies at the University of Wisconsin-Madison and LSE Centennial Professor at the London School of Economics and Political Science.  He teaches South Asian Law, Law and Social Science, Legal Profession, Religion and the Law, Contracts, Dispute Processing and Negotiations.  He has authored numerous books and articles related to law, the legal profession and the provision of legal services in India.

Galanter is also an expert on the Bhopal disaster that occurred in Bhopal, India in 1984. His collection of court documents, newspaper clippings, secondary sources and photos form the foundation of the "Bhopal: Law, Accidents, and Disasters in India" digital collection maintained by the University of Wisconsin Law School Library. The Bhopal digital archive contains thousands of documents, videos, a timeline and a bibliography of other works about the Bhopal disaster.

Books

References
UW Law bio
Marc Galanter's Web site

American legal writers
Living people
University of Chicago alumni 
University of Chicago Law School alumni
University of Wisconsin–Madison faculty
Year of birth missing (living people)
Bhopal disaster
University of Wisconsin Law School faculty